Acacia symonii, also known commonly as Symon's wattle, is a tree or shrub belonging to the genus Acacia and the subgenus Juliflorae that is endemic to parts of arid central Australia.

Description
The branchlets are usually glabrous but can have small hairs at the ribbed and resinous apices. Like most species of Acacia it has phyllodes rather than true leaves. The grey-green and erect phyllodes have a linear shape and can be stright or incurved slightly. It blooms from May to September producing yellow flowers. The pods can be straight or slightly curved and mostly flat but are raised over and constricted between the seeds.

Taxonomy
The species was first formally described by the botanist D.J.Whibley in 1980 as published in the Journal of the Adelaide Botanic Gardens. It was reclassified as Racosperma symonii by Leslie Pedley in 2003 and then transferred back genus Acacia in 2006. The specific epithet honours the South Australian botanist D. E. Symon, who collected the type specimen.

Distribution
It is native to an area in northern South Australia, southern parts of the Northern Territory and the central Goldfields region of Western Australia where it has a scattered disjunct distribution. It is often situated on low rocky ranges and growing in rocky red soils. In Western Australia it is found from north of Wiluna in the west with a range that extends through the Gibson Desert into South Australia. In South Australia the species is known only from western parts of the far north region in the Everard Ranges and the Birksgate Range from around Mount Lindsay.

See also
 List of Acacia species

References

symonii
Acacias of Western Australia
Flora of South Australia
Flora of the Northern Territory
Plants described in 1980